Hawa Tangara (born 12 January 1993) is a Malian footballer who plays for AS Real Bamako and the Mali national team.

She played for Mali at the 2016 Africa Women Cup of Nations.

She scored for Mali in a 2018 Africa Women Cup of Nations qualification match against Ivory Coast.

References

1993 births
Living people
Malian women's footballers
Mali women's international footballers
Women's association football forwards
21st-century Malian people